The 2009–10 Division 1 Féminine was the 36th edition of the women's league since its re-establishment by the French Football Federation. The league began on 27 September 2009 and ended on 13 June 2010. Olympique Lyonnais were the defending champions.

On 13 June 2010, Olympique Lyonnais successfully defended their league title winning the league by one point over Juvisy. The championship was assured following the club's 5–0 victory over Montigny-le-Bretonneux on the final match day of the season. Both Lyon and Juvisy will appear in next year's UEFA Women's Champions League. Montigny-le-Bretonneux and Soyaux were relegated to the second division.

League table
Note: A win in D1 Féminine is worth 4 points, with 2 points for a draw and 1 for a defeat.

Results

Top scorers
Le Sommer was the season's top scorer.

Player of the year
The nominees for the UNFP Female Player of the Year. The winner was determined at the annual UNFP Awards, which was held on 9 May. The winner is displayed in bold.

Managers

See also
 2009–10 Challenge de France

References

External links
 D1 Féminine Official Website
 D1 Féminine Standings and Statistics

Fra
2009
1